A national myth is an inspiring narrative or anecdote about a nation's past. Such myths often serve as important national symbols and affirm a set of national values. A national myth may sometimes take the form of a national epic or be incorporated into a civil religion. A group of related myths about a nation may be referred to as the national mythos, from μῦθος, the original Greek word for "myth".

A national myth is a legend or fictionalized narrative which has been elevated to a serious mythological, symbolic, and esteemed level so as to be true to the nation. It might simply over-dramatize true incidents, omit important historical details, or add details for which there is no evidence; or it might simply be a fictional story that no one takes to be true literally, but contains a symbolic meaning for the nation. The national folklore of many nations includes a founding myth, which may involve a struggle against colonialism or a war of independence or unification. In many cases, the meaning of the national myth is disputed among different parts of the population.

In some places, the national myth may be spiritual in tone and refer to stories of the nation's founding at the hands of a God, several gods, leaders favored by gods, or other supernatural beings. National myths serve many social and political purposes. National myths often exist only for the purpose of state-sponsored propaganda. In totalitarian dictatorships, the leader might be given, for example, a mythical supernatural life history in order to make them seem god-like and supra-powerful (see also cult of personality). However, national myths exist in every society. In liberal regimes they can serve the purpose of inspiring civic virtue and self-sacrifice, or of consolidating the power of dominant groups and legitimizing their rule.

Background 

National myths have been created and propagated by national intellectuals, who have used them as instruments of political mobilization on demographic bases such as ethnicity.

Social background 

The concept of national identity is inescapably connected with myths. A complex of myths is at the core of every ethnic identity. Some scholars believe that national identities, supported by invented histories, were constructed only after national movements and national ideologies emerged.

All modern national identities were preceded by nationalist movements. Although the term "nation" was used in the Middle Ages, it had usually an ethnic meaning and seldom referred to a state. In the age of nationalism, it was linked to efforts aimed at creating nation-states.

Psychological background 

Besides their social background, nationalist myths have also a psychological explanation which is connected with the nationalist myth of a stable homeland community. The complexity of relations within the modern external world and the incoherence of one's inner psychological world can result in anxiety which is reduced by static self-labeling and self-construction and gaining an imaginary emotion of stability.

Mythopoeic methods 
Traditional myth-making often depended on literary story-tellers - especially epic poets. Ancient Hellenic culture adopted Homer's Ionian Iliad as a justification of its theoretical unity, and Virgil (70 - 19 BCE) composed the Aeneid in support of the political renewal and reunification of the Roman world after lengthy civil wars. Generations of medieval writers (in poetry and prose) contributed to the Arthurian Matter of Britain, developing what became a focus for English nationalism by adopting British Celtic material. Camões( - 1580) composed in Macao the Lusiads as a national poetic epic for Portugal; Voltaire attempted a similar work for French mythologised history in the Henriade (1723). Wagnerian opera came to foster German national enthusiasm.

Modern purveyors of national mythologies have tended to pension off the poets and often appeal to the people more directly through telling phraseology in media. French pamphleteers spread the ideas of Liberty, Equality and Fraternity in the 1790s, and American journalists, politicians, and scholars popularized mythic tropes like "Manifest Destiny", "the Frontier", or the "Arsenal of Democracy". Socialists advocating ideas like the dictatorship of the proletariat have promoted catchy nation-promoting slogans such as "Socialism with Chinese characteristics" and "Kim Il-sung thought".

Primary myths 

Two of nationalism's primary myths are connected with beliefs in:
 community's permanence (the myth of the eternal nation), based on its national character, territory and institutions and on its continuity across many generations, and
 community's common ancestry (myth of the common ancestry).

Consequences 

Nationalist myths sometimes tend to stimulate conflicts between nations, to magnify distinctive characteristics of the national group and to overstate the threat to the nation posed by other groups propagating militant fulfillment of their goals.

List of national myths

Kupe and Māori settlement in New Zealand
Treaty of Waitangi, treated as the founding document of contemporary New Zealand

See also
 Anzac spirit
 Civil religion
 Euromyth
 Folk epics
 Founding myth
 Imagined community
 Nationalism and archaeology
 Nationalist historiography
 Nationalization of history
 Mythomoteur
 Nation branding
 National epic
 National monument
 National mysticism
 Noble lie
 Political myth
 Primordialism
 Ernest Renan
 What is a Nation?

References

Further reading 

 
 
 
 
 
 
 
 
 
 

Myth
Mythography

Propaganda